World history or global history as a field of historical study examines history from a global perspective. It emerged centuries ago; leading practitioners have included Voltaire (1694–1778), Hegel (1770–1831), Karl Marx (1818–1883), Oswald Spengler (1880–1936), and Arnold J. Toynbee (1889–1975). The field became much more active (in terms of university teaching, text books, scholarly journals, and academic associations) in the late 20th century. It is not to be confused with comparative history, which, like world history, deals with the history of multiple cultures and nations, but does not do so on a global scale. World history looks for common patterns that emerge across all cultures. World historians use a thematic approach, with two major focal points: integration (how processes of world history have drawn people of the world together) and difference (how patterns of world history reveal the diversity of the human experience).

Establishment and perimeters of the field

Jerry H. Bentley has observed that "the term world history has never been a clear signifier with a stable referent", and that usage of the term overlaps with universal history, comparative history, global history, big history, macro history, and transnational history, among others.

The advent of world history as a distinct academic field of study can be traced to the 1960s, but the pace quickened in the 1980s. A key step was the creation of the World History Association and graduate programs at a handful of universities. Over the next decades scholarly publications, professional and academic organizations, and graduate programs in World History proliferated. World History has often displaced Western Civilization in the required curriculum of American high schools and universities, and is supported by new textbooks with a world history approach.

World History attempts to recognize and address two structures that have profoundly shaped professional history-writing:
 A tendency to use current nation-states to set the boundaries and agendas of studies of the past.
 A deep legacy of Eurocentric assumptions (found especially, but not only, in Western history-writing).
Thus World History tends to study networks, connections, and systems that cross traditional boundaries of historical study like linguistic, cultural, and national borders. World History is often concerned to explore social dynamics that have led to large-scale changes in human society, such as industrialization and the spread of capitalism, and to analyse how large-scale changes like these have affected different parts of the world. Like other branches of history-writing in the second half of the twentieth century, World History has a scope far beyond historians' traditional focus on politics, wars, and diplomacy, taking in a panoply of subjects like gender history, social history, cultural history, and environmental history.

Organizations
 The H-World website and online network is used among some practitioners of world history, and allows discussions among scholars, announcements, syllabi, bibliographies and book reviews.
 The International Society for the Comparative Study of Civilizations (ISCSC) approaches world history from the standpoint of comparative civilizations.  Founded at a conference in 1961 in Salzburg, Austria, that was attended by Othmar Anderlie, Pitirim Sorokin, and Arnold J. Toynbee, this is an international association of scholars that publishes a journal, Comparative Civilization Review, and hosts an annual meeting in cities around the world.
 The Journal of Global History is a scholarly journal established in 2006 and is published by Cambridge University Press. 
 The World History Association (WHA) was established in 1982, and is predominantly an American phenomenon. Since 1990, it publishes the Journal of World History on a quarterly basis.

History

Pre-modern
The study of world history, as distinct from national history, has existed in many world cultures. However, early forms of world history were not truly global and were limited to only the regions known by the historian.

In Ancient China, Chinese world history, that of China and the surrounding people of East Asia was based on the dynastic cycle articulated by Sima Qian circa 100 BC. Sima Qian's model is based on the Mandate of Heaven. Rulers rise when they united China, then are overthrown when such dynasty became corrupt. Each new dynasty begins virtuous and strong, but then decays, provoking the transfer of Heaven's mandate to a new ruler. The test of virtue in a new dynasty is success in being obeyed by China and neighboring barbarians. After 2000 years Sima Qian's model still dominates scholarship, although the dynastic cycle is no longer used for modern Chinese history.

In Ancient Greece, Herodotus (5th century BC), as the founder of Greek historiography, presents discussions of the customs, geography, and history of Mediterranean peoples, particularly the Egyptians. His contemporary Thucydides rejected Herodotus's all-embracing approach to history, offering instead a more precise, sharply focused monograph, dealing not with vast empires over the centuries but with 27 years of war between Athens and Sparta. In Rome, the vast, patriotic history of Rome by Livy (59 BC – 17 AD) approximated Herodotean inclusiveness; Polybius (c.200-c.118 BC) aspired to combine the logical rigor of Thucydides with the scope of Herodotus.

Rashīd al-Dīn Fadhl-allāh Hamadānī (1247–1318), was a Persian physician of Jewish origin, polymathic writer, and historian, who wrote an enormous Islamic history, the Jami al-Tawarikh, in the Persian language, often considered a landmark in intercultural historiography and a key document on the Ilkhanids (13th and 14th century). His encyclopedic knowledge of a wide range of cultures from Mongolia to China to the Steppes of Central Eurasia to Persia, the Arabic-speaking lands, and Europe, provide the most direct access to information on the late Mongol era. His descriptions also highlight how the Mongol Empire and its emphasis on trade resulted in an atmosphere of cultural and religious exchange and intellectual ferment, resulting in the transmission of a host of ideas from East to West and vice versa.

One Muslim scholar, Ibn Khaldun (1332–1409) broke with traditionalism and offered a model of historical change in Muqaddimah, an exposition of the methodology of scientific history. Ibn Khaldun focused on the reasons for the rise and fall of civilization, arguing that the causes of change are to be sought in the economic and social structure of society. His work was largely ignored in the Muslim world.

Early modern
During the Renaissance in Europe, history was written about states or nations. The study of history changed during the Enlightenment and Romanticism. Voltaire described the history of certain ages that he considered important, rather than describing events in chronological order. History became an independent discipline. It was not called Philosophia Historiae anymore, but merely history (Historia). Voltaire, in the 18th century, attempted to revolutionize the study of world history. First, Voltaire concluded that the traditional study of history was flawed. The Christian Church, one of the most powerful entities in his time, had presented a framework for studying history. Voltaire, when writing History of Charles XII (1731) and The Age of Louis XIV (1751), instead choose to focus on economics, politics, and culture. These aspects of history were mostly unexplored by his contemporaries and would each develop into their sections of world history. Above all else, Voltaire regarded truth as the most essential part of recording world history. Nationalism and religion only subtracted from objective truth, so Voltaire freed himself for their influence when he recorded history.

Giambattista Vico (1668–1744) in Italy wrote Scienza Nuova seconda (The New Science) in 1725, which argued history as the expression of human will and deeds.  He thought that men are historical entities and that human nature changes over time. Each epoch should be seen as a whole in which all aspects of culture—art, religion, philosophy, politics, and economics—are interrelated (a point developed later by Oswald Spengler). Vico showed that myth, poetry, and art are entry points to discovering the true spirit of a culture. Vico outlined a conception of historical development in which great cultures, like Rome, undergo cycles of growth and decline.  His ideas were out of fashion during the Enlightenment but influenced the Romantic historians after 1800.

A major theoretical foundation for world history was given by German philosopher G. W. F. Hegel, who saw the modern Prussian state as the latest (though often confused with the highest) stage of world development.

G.W.F. Hegel developed three lenses through which he believed world history could be viewed. Documents produced during a historical period, such as journal entries and contractual agreements, were considered by Hegel to be part of Original History. These documents are produced by a person enveloped within a culture, making them conduits of vital information but also limited in their contextual knowledge. Documents which pertain to Hegel's Original History are classified by modern historians as primary sources.

Reflective History, Hegel's second lens, are documents written with some temporal distance separating the event which is discussed in academic writing. What limited this lens, according to Hegel, was the imposition of the writer's own cultural values and views on the historical event. This criticism of Reflective History was later formalized by Anthropologist Franz Boa and coined as Cultural relativism by Alain Locke. Both of these lenses were considered to be partially flawed by Hegel.

Hegel termed the lens which he advocated to view world history through as Philosophical History.  To view history through this lens, one must analyze events, civilizations, and periods objectively. When done in this fashion, the historian can then extract the prevailing theme from their studies. This lens differs from the rest because it is void of any cultural biases and takes a more analytical approach to history. World History can be a broad topic, so focusing on extracting the most valuable information from certain periods may be the most beneficial approach. This third lens, as did Hegel's definitions of the other two, affected the study of history in the early modern period and our contemporary period.

Another early modern historian was Adam Ferguson. Ferguson's main contribution to the study of world history was his An Essay on the History of Civil Society (1767). According to Ferguson, world history was a combination of two forms of history. One was natural history; the aspects of our world which God created. The other, which was more revolutionary, was social history. For him, social history was the progress humans made towards fulfilling God's plan for humanity. He believed that progress, which could be achieved through individuals pursuing commercial success, would bring us closer to a perfect society; but we would never reach one. However, he also theorized that complete dedication to commercial success could lead to societal collapses—like what happened in Rome—because people would lose morality. Through this lens, Ferguson viewed world history as humanity's struggle to reach an ideal society.

Henry Home, Lord Kames was a philosopher during the Enlightenment and contributed to the study of world history. In his major historical work, Sketches on the History of Man, Kames outlined the four stages of human history which he observed. The first and most primitive stage was small hunter-gatherer groups. Then, to form larger groups, humans transitioned into the second stage when they began to domesticate animals. The third stage was the development of agriculture. This new technology established trade and higher levels of cooperation amongst sizable groups of people. With the gathering of people into agricultural villages, laws and social obligations needed to be developed so a form of order could be maintained. The fourth, and final stage, involved humans moving into market towns and seaports where agriculture was not the focus. Instead, commerce and other forms of labor arouse in a society. By defining the stages of human history, Homes influenced his successors. He also contributed to the development of other studies such as sociology and anthropology.

The Marxist theory of historical materialism claims the history of the world is fundamentally determined by the material conditions at any given time – in other words, the relationships which people have with each other to fulfil basic needs such as feeding, clothing and housing themselves and their families. Overall, Marx and Engels claimed to have identified five successive stages of the development of these material conditions in Western Europe.
The theory divides the history of the world into the following periods: Primitive communism; Slave society; Feudalism; Capitalism; and Socialism.

Regna Darnell and Frederic Gleach argue that, in the Soviet Union, the Marxian theory of history was the only accepted orthodoxy, and stifled research into other schools of thought on history.  However, adherents of Marx's theories argue that Stalin distorted Marxism.

Contemporary
World history became a popular genre in the 20th century with universal history. In the 1920s, several best-sellers dealt with the history of the world, including surveys The Story of Mankind (1921) by Hendrik Willem van Loon and The Outline of History (1918) by H. G. Wells. Influential writers who have reached wide audiences include H. G. Wells, Oswald Spengler, Arnold J. Toynbee, Pitirim Sorokin, Carroll Quigley, Christopher Dawson, and Lewis Mumford. Scholars working the field include Eric Voegelin, William Hardy McNeill and Michael Mann. With evolving technologies such as dating methods and surveying laser technology called LiDAR, contemporary historians have access to new information which changes how past civilizations are studied.

Spengler's Decline of the West (2 vol 1919–1922) compared nine organic cultures: Egyptian (3400–1200 BC), Indian (1500–1100 BC), Chinese (1300 BC–AD 200), Classical (1100–400 BC), Byzantine (AD 300–1100), Aztec (AD 1300–1500), Arabian (AD 300–1250), Mayan (AD 600–960), and Western (AD 900–1900). His book was a success among intellectuals worldwide as it predicted the disintegration of European and American civilization after a violent "age of Caesarism," arguing by detailed analogies with other civilizations. It deepened the post-World War I pessimism in Europe, and was warmly received by intellectuals in China, India, and Latin America who hoped his predictions of the collapse of European empires would soon come true.

In 1936–1954, Toynbee's ten-volume A Study of History came out in three separate installments. He followed Spengler in taking a comparative topical approach to independent civilizations. Toynbee said they displayed striking parallels in their origin, growth, and decay. Toynbee rejected Spengler's biological model of civilizations as organisms with a typical life span of 1,000 years. Like Sima Qian, Toynbee explained decline as due to their moral failure. Many readers rejoiced in his implication (in vols. 1–6) that only a return to some form of Catholicism could halt the breakdown of western civilization which began with the Reformation. Volumes 7–10, published in 1954, abandoned the religious message, and his popular audience shrunk while scholars picked apart his mistakes.

McNeill wrote The Rise of the West (1963) to improve upon Toynbee by showing how the separate civilizations of Eurasia interacted from the very beginning of their history, borrowing critical skills from one another, and thus precipitating still further change as adjustment between traditional old and borrowed new knowledge and practice became necessary. McNeill took a broad approach organized around the interactions of peoples across the Earth. Such interactions have become both more numerous and more continual and substantial in recent times. Before about 1500, the network of communication between cultures was that of Eurasia. The term for these areas of interaction differ from one world historian to another and include world-system and ecumene. The importance of these intercultural contacts has begun to be recognized by many scholars.

History education

United States
As early as 1884, the American Historical Association advocated the study of the past on a world scale.
T. Walter Wallbank and Alastair M. Taylor co-authored Civilization Past & Present, the first world-history textbook published in the United States (1942). With additional authors, this very successful work went through numerous editions up to the first decade of the twenty-first century. According to the Golden Anniversary edition of 1992, the ongoing objective of Civilization Past & Present "was to present a survey of world cultural history, treating the development and growth of civilization not as a unique European experience but as a global one through which all the great culture systems have interacted to produce the present-day world. It attempted to include all the elements of history – social, economic, political, religious, aesthetic, legal, and technological."
Just as World War I strongly encouraged American historians to expand the study of Europe than to courses on Western civilization, World War II enhanced the global perspectives, especially regarding Asia and Africa. Louis Gottschalk, William H. McNeill, and Leften S. Stavrianos became leaders in the integration of world history to the American College curriculum. Gottschalk began work on the UNESCO 'History of Mankind: Cultural and Scientific Development' in 1951. McNeill, influenced by Toynbee, broadened his work on the 20th century to new topics. Since 1982 the World History Association at several regional associations began a program to help history professors broaden their coverage in freshman courses; world history became a popular replacement for courses on Western civilization. Professors Patrick Manning, at the University of Pittsburgh's World History Center; and Ross E. Dunn at San Diego State are leaders in promoting innovative teaching methods.

In related disciplines, such as art history and architectural history, global perspectives have been promoted as well. In schools of architecture in the U.S., the National Architectural Accrediting Board now requires that schools teach history that includes a non-west or global perspective. This reflects a decade-long effort to move past the standard Euro-centric approach that had dominated the field.

Recent themes
In recent years, the relationship between African and world history has shifted rapidly from one of antipathy to one of engagement and synthesis. Reynolds (2007) surveys the relationship between African and world histories, with an emphasis on the tension between the area studies paradigm and the growing world-history emphasis on connections and exchange across regional boundaries. A closer examination of recent exchanges and debates over the merits of this exchange is also featured. Reynolds sees the relationship between African and world history as a measure of the changing nature of historical inquiry over the past century.

Authors and their books on world history
Christopher Bayly, The Birth of the Modern World: Global Connections and Comparisons, 1780–1914 (London, 2004)
Jerry Bentley, (1949–2012) Founder and editor of the Journal of World History
Jacques Bertin, Atlas historique universel. Panorama de l'histoire du monde, Geneva, Minerva, 1997
Fernand Braudel, (1903–1985) Civilisation matérielle, économie et capitalisme (Paris, 1973, 3 vols.); English translation, Civilization and Capitalism, 15th–18th Centuries, translated by Siân Reynolds, 3 vols. (1979)
Philip D. Curtin (1922–2009), The World and the West: The European Challenge and the Overseas Response in the Age of Empire. (2000) 308 pp. . online review
Christopher Dawson (1889–1970) Religion and the Rise of Western Culture (1950) excerpt and text search
Will Durant (1885–1981) and Ariel Durant (1898–1981); The Story of Civilization (1935–1975).
Friedrich Engels (1820–1895), The Origin of the Family, Private Property and the State (Zurich, 1884)
Felipe Fernandez-Armesto (b. 1950), "Millennium" (1995), "Civilizations" (2000), "The World" (2007).
Francis Fukuyama (1952– ) The End of History and the Last Man (1992)
Samuel P. Huntington (1927 - 2008) The Clash of Civilizations and the Remaking of World Order (1996)
Georg Wilhelm Friedrich Hegel (1770–1830), philosopher of world history
Akira Iriye, Global and Transnational History: The Past, Present, and Future’’ (2012)
Peter Kropotkin (1842–1921), The State: Its Historic Role (London, 1896)
Patrick Manning, Navigating World History: Historians Create a Global Past (2003)
William Hardy McNeill (born 1917); see especially The Rise of the West: A History of the Human Community (1963)
Robert McNeill and William H. McNeill. The Human Web: A Bird's-Eye View of World History (2003) excerpt and text search
Jawaharlal Nehru (1889–1964), Glimpses of World History (1930–1933)
Diego Olstein, (2021) A Brief History of Now: The Past and Present of Global Power
Jürgen Osterhammel, The Transformation of the World: A Global History of the Nineteenth Century (2014) excerpt
Carroll Quigley (1910–1977), The Evolution of Civilizations (1961), Tragedy and Hope: A History of the World in Our Time (1966), Weapons Systems and Political Stability: A History (1983)
Pitirim Sorokin (1889–1968), Russian-American macrosociology; Social and Cultural Dynamics (4 vol., 1937–41)
Oswald Spengler (1880–1936), German; The Decline of the West (1918–22) vol 1 online; vol 2 online; excerpt and text search, abridged edition
Peter Stearns, (1936–) USA; World History in Brief: Major Patterns of Change and Continuity, 7th ed. (2009); Encyclopedia of World History, 6th ed. (200pp)
Luc-Normand Tellier, Canadian; Urban World History, PUQ, (2009), 650 pages; online edition
Arnold J. Toynbee, British; A Study of History (1934–61)
Eric Voegelin (1901–1985) Order and History (1956–85)
Immanuel Wallerstein, World-systems theory
Giano Rocca, "The Ultimate Meaning of Human Existence - The Scientific Method Applied to the Human Condition - Book I" (2016)

See also

 History of globalization
 Political history of the world

References

Bibliography
Surveys of world history
 Bayly, Christopher Alan. The birth of the modern world, 1780–1914: global connections and comparisons (Blackwell, 2004)
 Bullet, Richard et al., The Earth and Its Peoples 6th ed. (2 vol, 2014), university textbook
 Duiker, William J. Duiker and Jackson J. Spielvogel. World History (2 vol 2006), university textbook
 Dupuy, R. Ernest and Trevor N. Dupuy. The Encyclopedia of Military History: From 3500 B.C. to the Present (1977), 1465 pp; comprehensive discussion focused on wars and battles
 Gombrich, Ernst.  A Little History of the World (1936 & 1995)
 Grenville, J.A.S. A History of the World: From the 20th to the 21st Century (2005)
 Lee, Wayne E. Waging War: Conflict, Culture, and Innovation in World History (2015) excerpt
 McKay, John P. and Bennett D. Hill. A History of World Societies (2 vol. 2011), university textbook
 McNeill, William H. A World History (1998), University textbook
 McNeill, William H., Jerry H. Bentley, and David Christian, eds. Berkshire Encyclopedia Of World History (5 vol 2005)
 Osterhammel, Jürgen. The Transformation of the World: A Global History of the Nineteenth Century (Princeton University Press, 2014), 1167pp
 Paine, Lincoln. The sea and civilization: a maritime history of the world (Knopf, 2013). Pp. xxxv+ 744. 72 illustrations, 17 maps.  excerpt
 Roberts, J. M. and O. A. Westad. The History of the World (2013)
 Rosenberg, Emily, et al. eds. A World Connecting: 1870–1945 (2012)
 Stearns, Peter N. ed. Oxford Encyclopedia of the Modern World: 1750 to the Present  (8 vol. 2008)
 Stearns, Peter N. The Industrial Revolution in World History (1998) online edition
 Szulc, Tad. Then and Now: How the World Has Changed since W.W. II. (1990). 515 p. ; Popular history
 Tignor, Robert, et al. Worlds Together, Worlds Apart: A History of the World (4th ed, 2 vol. 2013), University textbook
 Watt, D. C., Frank Spencer, Neville Brown. A History of the World in the Twentieth Century (1967)

Transnational histories
 Adam, Thomas. Intercultural Transfers and the Making of the Modern World, 1800–2000: Sources and Contexts (2011)
 Boon, Marten. "Business Enterprise and Globalization: Towards a Transnational Business History." Business History Review 91.3 (2017): 511–535.
 Davies, Thomas Richard. NGOs: A new history of transnational civil society (2014).
 Ember, Carol R. Melvin Ember, and Ian A. Skoggard, eds. Encyclopedia of diasporas: immigrant and refugee cultures around the world (2004).
 Iriye, Akira. Global and Transnational History: The Past, Present, and Future (2010), 94pp
 Iriye, Akira  and Pierre-Yves Saunier, eds. The Palgrave Dictionary of Transnational History: From the mid-19th century to the present day (2009); 1232pp; 400 entries by scholars.
 Osterhammel, Jürgen and Niels P. Petersson. Globalization: A Short History  (2009)
 Pieke Frank N., Nyíri Pál, Thunø Mette, and Ceddagno Antonella. Transnational Chinese: Fujianese migrants in Europe (2004) 
 Saunier, Pierre-Yves. Transnational History (2013)

Atlases
 Barraclough, Geoffrey, ed. The Times Atlas of World History (1979).
 Catchpole, Brian.  Map History of the Modern World (1982)
 Darby, H. C., and H. Fullard, eds. The New Cambridge Modern History, Vol. 14: Atlas (1970)
 Haywood, John. Atlas of world history (1997) online free
 Kinder, Hermann and Werner Hilgemann. Anchor Atlas of World History (2 vol. 1978); advanced analytical maps, mostly of Europe
 O'Brian, Patrick. Atlas of World History (2010).  excerpt
 Rand McNally. Historical atlas of the world (1997) online free
 Santon, Kate, and Liz McKay, eds. Atlas of World History (2005).

Historiography
 Adas, Michael. Essays on Twentieth-Century History (2010); historiographic essays on world history conceptualizing the "long" 20th century, from the 1870s to the early 2000s.
 Allardyce, Gilbert.  "Toward world history: American historians and the coming of the world history course." Journal of World History 1.1 (1990): 23–76.
 Bentley, Jerry H., ed. The Oxford Handbook of World History (Oxford University Press, 2011)
 Costello, Paul. World Historians and Their Goals: Twentieth-Century Answers to Modernism (1993).
 Curtin, Philip D.  "Depth, Span, and Relevance," The American Historical Review, Vol. 89, No. 1 (Feb., 1984), pp. 1–9 in JSTOR
 Dunn, Ross E., ed. The New World History: A Teacher's Companion. (2000). 607pp.  online review
 Frye, Northrop. "Spengler Revisited" in Northrop Frye on modern culture (2003), pp 297–382, first published 1974; online
 Hare, J. Laurence, and Jack Wells. "Promising the World: Surveys, Curricula, and the Challenge of Global History," History Teacher, 48 (Feb. 2015) pp: 371–88. online
 Hughes-Warrington, Marnie. Palgrave Advances in World Histories (2005), 256pp, articles by scholars
 Lang, Michael. "Globalization and Global History in Toynbee," Journal of World History 22#4 Dec. 2011 pp. 747–783 in project MUSE
 McInnes, Neil. "The Great Doomsayer: Oswald Spengler Reconsidered." National Interest 1997 (48): 65–76.  Fulltext: Ebsco
 McNeill, William H. "The Changing Shape of World History." History and Theory 1995 34(2): 8–26.  in JSTOR
 Manning, Patrick. Navigating World History: Historians Create a Global Past (2003), an important  guide to the entire field excerpt and text search; online review
 Mazlish, Bruce. "Comparing Global History to World History," Journal of Interdisciplinary History, Vol. 28, No. 3 (Winter, 1998), pp. 385–395 in JSTOR
 Moore, Robert I. "World history." in Michael Bentley, ed., Companion to historiography (1997): 941–59.
 National Center for History in the Schools at UCLA. World History: The Big Eras, A Compact History of Humankind (2009), 96pp
 Neiberg, Michael S. Warfare in World History (2001) online edition
 Patel, Klaus Kiran: Transnational History, European History Online, Mainz: Institute of European History(2011) retrieved: November 11, 2011.
 Richards, Michael D. Revolutions in World History (2003) online edition
 Roupp, Heidi, ed. Teaching World History: A Resource Book. (1997), 274pp; online edition
 Sachsenmaier, Dominic, "Global Perspectives on Global History" (2011), Cambridge UP
 Smil, Vaclav. Energy in World History (1994) online edition
 Tellier, Luc-Normand. Urban World History (2009), PUQ, 650 pages; online edition
 Watts, Sheldon. Disease and Medicine in World History'' (2003) online edition

External links

Professional groups
World History Association
H-World The H-World discussion list
CLIOH-WORLD CLIOH-WORLD: European Erasmus Network about researching, teaching and learning world history

Resources
 Bridging World History texts and projects for advanced secondary course
free database of over 1500 photos, documents, maps and images, ready for classroom use
Student Handouts, Inc. Free World History Lesson Plans, Handouts, and Worksheets
Our World In Data—Web publication by Max Roser (from the University of Oxford) that visualises how living standards around the world have changed historically. Makes data available and covers a wide range of topics: Historical trends in health, food provision, the growth and distribution of incomes, violence, rights, wars, energy use, education, environmental changes and many other aspects are empirically analysed and visualised in this open access web publication.
World History Matters	
The TimeMap of World History - World History Atlas
HistoryWorld
World History For Us All – (Christian) World History Model Curriculum 	
Erik Ringmar, History of International Relations Open Textbook Project, Cambridge: Open Book, forthcoming.
EDSITEment's World History vetted websites and lesson plans EDSITEment, "The Best of the Humanities on the Web"
Scottish Centre for Global History - Public history blog that shares ongoing world history research projects from around the world. 

 
1980s introductions
Fields of history
Historiography